The Language Resource Center (LRC) Program of the U.S. Department of Education, administered by the International Foreign Language Education Service under Title VI of the Higher Education Act, funds grants to American universities for establishing, strengthening, and operating centers that serve as resources for improving the nation's capacity for teaching and learning foreign languages through teacher training, research, materials development, and dissemination projects.

The common goal of the Language Resource Centers (LRCs) is to promote the learning and teaching of foreign languages in the United States through improving language teacher education, developing improved assessment measures, and conducting research. The US Department of Education established the first LRCs at US universities in 1990 in response to the growing national need for expertise and competence in foreign languages.  Led by nationally and internationally recognized language professionals, LRCs create language learning materials, offer professional development workshops, and conduct research on foreign language learning.

The Language Resource Centers created a common LRC Web Portal, which provides a searchable database to all of LRC the materials, resources, and professional development opportunities.

References

Language education in the United States